This is a timeline documenting the events of heavy metal in the year 2006.

Newly formed bands 
1000mods
A Band of Orcs
Abandon All Ships
Adelitas Way
All Hail the Yeti
Almah
Altar of Plagues
Amberian Dawn
American Me
Ancestors
Ancient Bards
Thy Art Is Murder
Arven
Asking Alexandria
Beastwars
Bison B.C.
Black Breath
Black Veil Brides
Blood Ceremony
Bloodsoaked
Brymir
Bury Tomorrow
Cannabis Corpse
Castevet
Cauldron
Cerebral Bore
Circle of Contempt
Coldworker
Conan
Daughtry 
Den Saakaldte
Dethklok
The Devil's Blood
 Diabulus in Musica
Divide the Sea
Dragged into Sunlight
Elder 
Elysion
Fen 
Forever Storm
Ghost
Graveyard 
Hail of Bullets 
Hellyeah
I 
Nekrogoblikon
Oceano
Pathfinder 
Revocation
Scars on Broadway
Skull Fist
Stone Gods
Success Will Write Apocalypse Across the Sky
UnSun
Van Canto
Vola
Whitechapel
Winterfylleth

Reformed bands 
 Alcatrazz
 Alice in Chains
 Atheist
 Carnivore
 Emperor (for a few shows)
 Extreme (for a few shows)
 Immortal
 Myrkskog (for a one-off show. they are now defunct)
 Pitchshifter
 Sir Lord Baltimore

Disbandments 
 Burning My Abigail
 Cold (reformed in 2009)
 Crashdïet
 Dissection
 Fear Factory
 Full Scale (reformed in 2009)
 Limp Bizkit (on hiatus until 2009)
 Myrkskog
 Peccatum
 System of a Down (on hiatus)
 Terrorizer

Events 
 20 May – Lordi wins the Eurovision Song Contest 2006 for Finland with the song Hard Rock Hallelujah in Athens, Greece.
 Slipknot goes on hiatus until 2008 while members work on their "side projects".
 Queen, Judas Priest, Def Leppard, and Kiss are the first bands inducted into the VH1 Rock Honors.
 Alice in Chains reunite with the Jar of Flies line-up and singer William DuVall replaces the late Layne Staley.
 Body Count releases their first album in nine years, Murder 4 Hire. The album features the band's new line-up: Bendrix (rhythm guitar), Vincent Price (bass), and O.T. (drums).
 Slayer releases their tenth studio album, Christ Illusion. The album entered the Billboard 200 at number 5—the band's highest U.S. chart position to date. The single Eyes of the Insane won the Best Metal Performance category at the 49th Grammy Awards.
 Extreme reunite for a second time – now with their "classic" original line-up – to do a small three-show reunion tour in New England.
 System of a Down goes on a long-term hiatus.
 Jesse Pintado of Terrorizer and formerly of Napalm Death passes away.
 Opeth drummer Martin Lopez officially and permanently leaves Opeth on May 12, 2006, due to illness and is replaced by Martin Axenrot.
 Metalocalypse airs on the Adult Swim network.
 Mercenary bassist/vocalist Henrik "Kral" Andersen leaves in March and is replaced by René Pedersen.
 Visions of Atlantis keyboardist Miro Holly quits and is replaced by Martin Harb.
 Chimaira drummer Andols Herrick rejoins the band (after leaving in 2003), forcing the departure of Kevin Talley.
Tapio Wilska was fired from Finntroll due to personal differences.
 Iggor Cavalera leaves Sepultura due to "artistic incompatibility".

Albums released

January

February

March

April

May

June

July

August

September

October

November

December

See also 
 2006 in Swiss music

References 

2000s in heavy metal music
Metal